{{DISPLAYTITLE:Pi1 Pegasi}}

Pi1 Pegasi, Latinized from π1 Pegasi, is a star in the constellation Pegasus. Based upon changes to the proper motion of the visible component, this is a probable astrometric binary. It has a yellow hue and is dimply visible to the naked eye with a combined apparent visual magnitude of +5.58. The system is located approximately 319 light years distant from the Sun based on parallax, and is drifting further away with a radial velocity of +5 km/s. It is a member of the Ursa Major Moving Group of co-moving stars.

The visible component is an aging giant star with a stellar classification of G8IIIb. It has a high rate of spin, with a projected rotational velocity of 135 km/s. This is giving it an equatorial bulge that is 17% larger than the polar radius. It is a shell star, being orbited by a circumstellar shell of cooler gas. This star is 530 million years old with 2.5 times the mass of the Sun. With the supply of hydrogen exhausted at its core, the star has cooled and expanded to 11 times the Sun's radius. It is radiating 63 times the luminosity of the Sun from its enlarged photosphere at an effective temperature of 4,898 K.

References

External links

G-type giants
Shell stars
Astrometric binaries

Pegasus (constellation)
Pegasi, Pi1
Durchmusterung objects
Pegasi, 27
210354
109352
8449
Ursa Major Moving Group